Endestadvatnet is a lake in the municipality of Kinn in Vestland county, Norway.

See also
List of lakes in Norway

References

Lakes of Vestland
Kinn